Walter Marciano de Queirós (15 September 1931 – 21 June 1961) was a Brazilian footballer. He was capped seven times by Brazil. He died in a car crash in 1961.

Career statistics

Club

Notes

International

References

1931 births
1961 deaths
Brazilian footballers
Brazilian expatriate footballers
Brazil international footballers
Association football midfielders
Campeonato Brasileiro Série A players
La Liga players
Associação Desportiva São Caetano players
Santos FC players
CR Vasco da Gama players
Valencia CF players
Brazilian expatriate sportspeople in Spain
Expatriate footballers in Spain
Sportspeople from Santos, São Paulo